Archbishop McNicholas High School is a coed school in the neighborhood of Mt. Washington in Cincinnati, Ohio, USA.  The school was opened in 1951 and named in honor of John T. McNicholas, Archbishop of Cincinnati.

In 1915, St. Joseph Academy, an all-girls academy, was opened as a day and boarding school operated by the Sisters of St. Joseph of Medaille. In 1950, Archbishop John T. McNicholas designated the academy would become the first co-ed parochial high school in Cincinnati. Archbishop McNicholas died before the school was opened and his successor, Archbishop Karl J. Alter approved on January 15, 1951, that the school be named for Archbishop McNicholas.

The school was purchased from the Sisters of Saint Joseph of Medaille by the Roman Catholic Archdiocese of Cincinnati in 1998.

The geographic district of Archbishop McNicholas High School is on the eastern side of Hamilton County and extends into Clermont and Brown Counties.

Academics
The curriculum is accredited by the Ohio Department of Education and the Ohio Catholic School Accrediting Association.  99% of the students attending McNicholas High School further their education in post-secondary schools and colleges. It is required that students have two semester-length theology classes every year at McNicholas, as well as community service hours.

Students enjoy small class sizes with a 12:1 student/teacher ratio.

Project Paradise
After many years of anticipation McNicholas High School Rockets have a home football field. The Penn Station stadium is behind the school in the area known by all alumni as "Paradise". Addition phases will be completed as funds allow. The first phase included the turf field, an all weather track, a scoreboard and goal posts, bleachers and a press box.

In the final phase the school will build new restrooms and a concession stand. Eventual plans include the installation of permanent stadium lights, a “field house” with locker rooms, weight room, and a meeting room.

On August 24, 2018, the community celebrated the first football game under the newly installed stadium lights. The stadium lights marked a major and long-awaited improvement to the athletic complex.

Athletics

Ohio High School Athletic Association State Championships

 Men's soccer – 1984
 Baseball – 1998
 Men's Golf - 2016 
 Women's Basketball – 2001
 Women's Soccer - 2014

District and Regional Championships
Men's Basketball (District)1974, 1981, 1983, 1984, 1985, 1991, 1992, 1993, 1995, 1998, 1999  (Regional) 1974, 1984, 1985, 1991, 1993, 1995
Women's Basketball (District) 2001, 2002, 2003, 2007 (Regional) 2001
Men's Volleyball (District) 2004, 2006, 2007, 2008, 2009, 2013, 2015, 2016 (Regional) 2008, 2014, 2016
Women's Volleyball (District) 1975, 1976, 2003, 2004, 2005, 2006, 2007, 2012, 2013, 2014
Women's soccer District 2013,2014,2016 Regional 2014

Other athletic accomplishments
 Girls Dance Team state champions - 2007, 2009, 2015, 2016. Performed in 2009 Orange Bowl

National Championships
 Girls Dance Team -  2008, 2009, 2011, 2013, 2016

Notable alumni
Notable alumni include:
 Larry Cipa (1969) - football player (NFL)
 Kevin Huber (2004) - football player, Cincinnati Bengals
 Tom Mooney (1970) - educator, President of the Ohio Federation of Teachers
 Jean Schmidt (1970) - former US House Representative for the second district of Ohio.
 Pat Tabler (1976) - baseball player (MLB)
 Bob Wiesenhahn (1957) - basketball player (NBA and Cincinnati Bearcats - National Championship Team)

References

External links
Archbishop McNicholas High School

Educational institutions established in 1951
High schools in Hamilton County, Ohio
Private schools in Cincinnati
Catholic secondary schools in Ohio
Roman Catholic Archdiocese of Cincinnati
Sisters of Saint Joseph schools
1951 establishments in Ohio